Vatsal Mahesh Vaghela (born 20 March 2002) is an American cricketer who plays as an bowler for the United States national cricket team. He started playing American youth cricket with the Northern California Cricket Association. He plays for Golden State Grizzles in Minor League Cricket.

Biography
Vaghela was born and raised in California to an Indian immigrant family. His sister, Isani Vaghela, also plays international cricket for the United States.

In December 2021, Vaghela was named in the United States Twenty20 International (T20I) squad for their series against Ireland. He made his Twenty20 International (T20I) debut on 23 December 2021, for the United States against Ireland.

References

2002 births
Living people
People from Milpitas, California
American cricketers
Cricketers from California
United States Twenty20 International cricketers
American sportspeople of Indian descent